Erica Erinma Ogwumike (born September 26, 1997) is a Nigerian American basketball player. She played college basketball for the Rice Owls.

In July 2020, she announced her decision to play for the Nigeria women's national basketball team in the Tokyo Olympics. Aside from athletics, Ogwumike is also an aspiring doctor and is currently in medical school.

High School Career
Ogwumike played High school basketball for Cypress Woods High School; she holds the records for most career points for Cypress Woods High School as she scored 2,227 career points, 1,141 rebounds and 440 steals; in all 143 games, she played for the school.

College career
Ogwumike started her college career with the Pepperdine Waves women's basketball team, where she averaged 18.4 points, 7.5 rebounds and 2.3 assists per game in her freshman season. She transferred to Rice University in 2016, where she couldn't play the 2016–17 season for the Rice Owls women's basketball team due to transfer rules. In her sophomore season in 2017, she averaged 17.9 points, 9.3 rebounds and 1.9 assists per game. In her junior year, she averaged 16.5 points, 10.5 rebounds and 2.7 assists. She played her senior year as a graduate student; she averaged 19 points, 10.3 rebounds and 2.7 assists.

Professional career

WNBA
On April 17, 2020, the New York Liberty selected Ogwumike as the 26th pick in the 2020 WNBA Draft. Later that night, she was traded to the Minnesota Lynx. She was waived by the Minnesota Lynx alongside Linnae Harper days after the draft.

National Team Career
Erica was called up and participated at the Nigeria women's national basketball team 10-day training camp for the 2020 Tokyo Olympic games in Atlanta by the team coach Otis Hughley Jr. She participated in the basketball event at the 2020 Summer Olympics where she averaged 1 rebound, and 1 assist.

Personal life
Ogwumike was born in Cypress, Texas. She has three older sisters who also play basketball—Nneka and Chiney of the Los Angeles Sparks, and Olivia of the Rice University Owls.

She is Catholic.

References

External links
Rice Owls bio
USA Basketball profile

1997 births
Living people
African-American Catholics
American people of Igbo descent
American sportspeople of Nigerian descent
American women's basketball players
Basketball players at the 2020 Summer Olympics
Basketball players from Texas
New York Liberty draft picks
Nigerian women's basketball players
Olympic basketball players of Nigeria
People from Cypress, Texas
Pepperdine Waves women's basketball players
Point guards
Rice Owls women's basketball players
Citizens of Nigeria through descent
African-American basketball players
Nigerian people of African-American descent
American emigrants to Nigeria
21st-century African-American sportspeople